Archips okuiho is a moth of the family Tortricidae. It is found in Vietnam.

The wingspan is 17 mm. The ground colour of the forewings is cream brown slightly mixed with pale ferruginous in the costal half. The strigulation is indistinct and brownish, although the basal third of the wing is suffused brown. The hindwings are brownish.

Etymology
This name refers to the type locality in Vietnam, Okui-ho.

References

Archips
Moths described in 2009
Moths of Asia